Sibylline Leaves: A Collection of Poems is a volume of poems by Samuel Taylor Coleridge, first published in 1817.

Contents

History 
Sibylline Leaves, which appeared in 1817 and was described as "A Collection of Poems", included the contents of the 1797 and 1803 editions of Poems on Various Subjects, the poems published in the Lyrical Ballads of 1798 and 1800, and the quarto pamphlet of 1798, but excluded the contents of the 1796 first edition of Poems (except The Eolian Harp), Christabel, Kubla Khan, and The Pains of Sleep. It also included the first publication of the revised and expanded version of The Rime of the Ancient Mariner with marginal gloss.

References

Sources 

 Birch, Dinah, ed. (2009). "Sibylline Leaves". The Oxford Companion to English Literature. 7th ed. Oxford University Press. Retrieved 20 August 2022.
Attribution:

Poetry by Samuel Taylor Coleridge
1817 books
English poetry collections